Brooksville is a town in Noxubee County, Mississippi, United States. The population was 1,223 at the 2010 census.

The Sam D. Hamilton Noxubee National Wildlife Refuge is located west of the town, and the Black Prairie Wildlife Management Area is located to the north.

History
The town's name comes from the several brooks which flow nearby.

A post office was established in 1846, and the town was incorporated in 1860.

Brooksville was a stop on the Mobile and Ohio Railroad, built in the 1850s.

Brooksville has a large Holdemann Mennonite community.

Geography
Brooksville is located at  (33.232853, -88.581600).

Demographics

2020 census

As of the 2020 United States Census, there were 915 people, 448 households, and 303 families residing in the town.

2000 census
At the census of 2000, there were 1,182 people, 439 households, and 305 families residing in the town. The population density was 1,189.1 people per square mile (461.0/km2). There were 480 housing units at an average density of 482.9 per square mile (187.2/km2). The racial makeup of the town was 19.12% White, 79.61% African American, 0.17% Asian, and 1.10% from two or more races. Hispanic or Latino of any race were 1.10% of the population.

There were 439 households, out of which 35.8% had children under the age of 18 living with them, 31.2% were married couples living together, 33.7% had a female householder with no husband present, and 30.5% were non-families. 28.2% of all households were made up of individuals, and 13.4% had someone living alone who was 65 years of age or older. The average household size was 2.69 and the average family size was 3.30.

In the town, the population was spread out, with 31.7% under the age of 18, 11.5% from 18 to 24, 26.6% from 25 to 44, 16.8% from 45 to 64, and 13.4% who were 65 years of age or older. The median age was 30 years. For every 100 females, there were 88.8 males. For every 100 females age 18 and over, there were 76.6 males.

The median income for a household in the town was $16,146, and the median income for a family was $20,804. Males had a median income of $26,513 versus $17,500 for females. The per capita income for the town was $9,001. About 38.0% of families and 44.4% of the population were below the poverty line, including 57.9% of those under age 18 and 25.2% of those age 65 or over.

In 2010, Brooksville had the 24th-lowest median household income of all places in the United States with a population over 1,000.

Economy
Peco Foods has had a poultry processing plant in Brooksville since 1993, which employs 232 workers.

Education
The town of Brooksville is served by the Noxubee County School District.

Notable people
 Dave Madison, professional baseball player.
 Frederick O'Neal, actor, director, and revolutionary trade unionist.

References

Towns in Noxubee County, Mississippi
Towns in Mississippi